DXN is a multilevel marketing company based in Malaysia. Founded in 1993 by Datuk Dr. Lim Siow Jin, DXN manufactures and markets dietary supplements containing the mushrooms Ganoderma or Lingzhi. DXN products are marketed by affiliated companies Daehsan, Ltd. and Daxen in some countries in Europe and Asia.

DXN Holdings Berhad was first listed on the main board of Bursa Malaysia in September 2003 and delisted in December 2011 following a takeover bid by the founder. DXN Holdings was the sole shareholder of Daxen Biotechnology, a Malaysia-based  manufacturer of monascus, vinegar, fruit enzymes and other beverage products.

In 2013, DXN’s office in Kerala, India, was raided by the crime branch of the Kerala Economic Offences Wing for alleged violations of the Prize Chits and Money Circulation Schemes (Banning) Act, 1978. According to the crime branch, the company was running a money-chain Ponzi scheme. Documents and goods valued at 11.2 million Rupees were seized during the raid.  
 
In May 2015, subsequent to Canadian Food Inspection Agency's inspection activities, a recall notice was issued in Canada for DXN brand instant coffees because the products contained milk which had not been declared on the product ingredient label. As such, the products posed a potential risk to consumers with milk allergies.

In 2018, DXN was listed 15th on the Direct Selling News Global 100 list of direct selling companies.

References

External links
 DXN Website

1993 establishments in Malaysia
Dietary supplements
Food and drink companies established in 1993
Marketing companies established in 1993
Multi-level marketing companies
Food and drink companies of Malaysia